The 1973 Indian Open was a men's tennis tournament played on outdoor clay courts in New Delhi, India. It was the inaugural edition of the event and was held from 15 October through 20 October 1973. The tournament was part of the Group B tier of the Grand Prix tennis circuit. Vijay Amritraj won the singles title.

Finals

Singles
 Vijay Amritraj defeated  Mal Anderson 6–4, 5–7, 8–9, 6–3, 11–9

Doubles
 Jim McManus /  Raúl Ramírez defeated  Anand Amritraj /  Vijay Amritraj 6–2, 6–4

References

External links
 International Tennis Federation (ITF) tournament edition details

Indian Open
OPen